Monteverdi Marittimo is a comune (municipality) in the Province of Pisa in the Italian region Tuscany, located about  southwest of Florence and about  southeast of Pisa.

References

Cities and towns in Tuscany